In geology, a stockwork is a complex system of structurally controlled or randomly oriented veins.  Stockworks are common in many ore deposit types and in greisens.  They are also referred to as stringer zones.

References 

Structural geology
Economic geology
Petrology